Boasberg is a surname. Notable people with the surname include:

Nathan Boasberg (1825–1910), American businessman
Al Boasberg (1891–1937), American comedy writer
James E. Boasberg (born 1963), American judge